This is a list of airports in Mali, sorted by location.



Airports 

Airport names shown in bold indicate the airport has scheduled service on commercial airlines.

See also 
 Transport in Mali
 List of airports by ICAO code: G#GA - Mali
 Wikipedia: WikiProject Aviation/Airline destination lists: Africa#Mali

References 
 
  - includes IATA codes
 Great Circle Mapper: Airports in Mali - IATA and ICAO codes
 World Aero Data: Mali - ICAO codes

 
Mali
Airports
Airports
Mali